The Clearwater Women's Open was a tournament for professional female tennis players played on outdoor hard courts. The event was classified as a $25,000 ITF Women's Circuit tournament and was held in Clearwater, Florida, United States, from 2005 to 2012.

Past finals

Singles

Doubles

External links 
 ITF search

ITF Women's World Tennis Tour
Hard court tennis tournaments in the United States
Clearwater Women's Open
Recurring sporting events established in 2005
Recurring sporting events disestablished in 2012
Sports in Clearwater, Florida
2005 establishments in Florida
2012 disestablishments in Florida
Women's sports in Florida